The Algerian Women's League Cup is a women's association football competition in Algeria. pitting regional teams against each other.  It was established in 2016.

Finals

Most successful clubs

See also
Algerian Women's Championship
Algerian Women's Cup
Algerian Women's Super Cup

References

External links
 Règlement de la Coupe de la ligue - Ligue du Football Féminin

 
Recurring sporting  events established in 2016
2016 establishments in Algeria